The Brussels Periphery (i.e. the "Brussels Rim", or Vlaamse Rand, i.e. the "Flemish Rim", or just De Rand, "the Rim") refers to 19 Flemish municipalities that encircle the Brussels-Capital Region. The Brussels Region is an enclave of the province of Flemish Brabant.

Many of these municipalities are essentially suburbs of Brussels. Due to their proximity to Brussels, they have been urbanised and their housing prices are high. As a consequence, a lot of well-paid people working in e.g. EU institutions reside here. Another issue, very sensitive in Belgian politics, is the francisation of this area. These municipalities all have Dutch as their sole official language, although six municipalities also offer services (known as language facilities) for French-speaking inhabitants, namely Drogenbos, Kraainem, Linkebeek, Sint-Genesius-Rode, Wemmel and Wezembeek-Oppem. Other municipalities include Asse, Beersel, Dilbeek, Grimbergen, Hoeilaart, Machelen, Meise, Merchtem, Overijse, Sint-Pieters-Leeuw, Tervuren, Vilvoorde and Zaventem.

Each year, De Gordel ("the belt"), a family walking and cycling event, is organised in this area as a symbolic affirmation that the municipalities involved are part of Flanders.

See also 
 Municipalities with language facilities
 Francisation of Brussels
 Arrondissement of Brussels-Periphery

Geography of Flemish Brabant
Regions of Flanders
Areas of Belgium
Belt regions